Kamugakudi is a small, ancient heritage village in Nannilam taluk, Tiruvarur district, Tamil Nadu, India.

References

Villages in Tiruvarur district